Smithville Flats is a census-designated place and hamlet in the town of Smithville, Chenango County, New York, United States. The zipcode is 13841. Its population was 351 as of the 2010 census.

Demographics

Notes

Census-designated places in New York (state)
Census-designated places in Chenango County, New York
Hamlets in New York (state)
Hamlets in Chenango County, New York